WER or Wer may refer to:

 Weak echo region, in meteorology, an area of markedly lower reflectivity within thunderstorms resulting from an increase in updraft strength
 Word error rate, in computational linguistics, a common metric of measuring the performance of a speech recognition system
 Windows Error Reporting, a feature of Windows XP and later operating systems
 Western Entrance to the Riedbahn, the western approach of the Riedbahn in Mannheim, Germany
 Wer (god), an Akkadian god
 Were, an archaic term for adult male humans
 Wiki Educational Resources Limited, the legal name of the first Wikimedia UK chapter
 Wer (film), a 2013 horror film

See also  
 Ver (disambiguation) 
 Vera (disambiguation)
 Vere (disambiguation)
 Verus (disambiguation)
 Wehr (disambiguation)